There are a number of museums dedicated to potatoes around the world, predominantly in North America and Europe.

Austria 
 Waldviertler Erdäpfelwelt (Waldviertler potato world) is a museum with interactive displays located in the town hall of Schweiggers displaying the history and uses of potatoes to the present day.

Belgium 
 Musée vivant de la pomme de terre ("Living Museum of the Potato") in Genappe is part of the Wallonia Botanical Gardens and also houses a collection of onions from northern Europe.
 Frietmuseum in Bruges is dedicated to chips (or fries in American-English) and is located in one of Bruges' oldest buildings, dated 1399.

Canada 
 The Canadian Potato Museum in O'Leary, Prince Edward Island, claims to contain the world's largest collection of potato artifacts. It is also home to a Potato Hall of Fame.
 Potato World is a museum dedicated to the potato. It is located in Florenceville-Bristol, New Brunswick, known as the french fry capital of the world.

Denmark 
 Danmarks Kartoffelmuseum ("Danish Potato Museum") in Otterup is part of the Hofmansgave estate. The Hofmansgaves were responsible for popularising the potato in Denmark where potatoes were known as "German lumps".

France 
 Moulin Gentrey in Harsault (fr) is a former starch mill dating from 1870 which contains a small potato museum as part of a historical tour of starch making for the textile industry.

Germany 
 Deutsches Kartoffelmuseum ("German Potato Museum") in Fußgönheim (de) is housed in a former synagogue next to the Fußgönheim Agricultural Museum. The museum dates from 1987.
 Das Kartoffelmuseum ("The Potato Museum") in Munich dates from 1996 and is run by the Otto Eckart Foundation on behalf of Pfanni GmbH, a division of Unilever.
 Vorpommersches Kartoffelmuseum ("Potato Museum of Vorpommern") in Tribsees (de)

Italy 
 Museo della patata ("Potato Museum") in Budrio

Lithuania 
 There is a Bulvės muziejus ("Potato Museum") in Kudirkos Naumiestis, near the border with Kaliningrad.

United States 
 Potato Museum in Albuquerque, New Mexico, was originally housed in the basement of E. Thomas and Meredith Hughes' basement in Washington, D.C., before moving to Albuquerque in 1993. It began in 1975 and is a nonprofit organization.
 Idaho Potato Museum is in Blackfoot, Idaho, and among the exhibits has the world's largest potato chip (crisp in British-English), a Pringle measuring

See also

 List of food and beverage museums
 Spring Onion Culture Museum
 World Carrot Museum

References

 
Potato